Karim was an Italian record label active from 1960 to 1966, when it closed.

History
The Karim label was started in 1960 by Giovanni Fischietti and Gaetano Purvilenti.  From the start it was a S.p.A., making 45s and LPs. Some of the more famous singers on the label were Fabrizio De André, Orietta Berti, Jula de Palma and Memo Remigi.

Catalogue

LP
Fabrizio De André: Tutto Fabrizio De André (1966) (KLP 13)

45 rpm
Fabrizio: Nuvole barocche/E fu la notte (1961) (KN 101)
Fabrizio: Ballata del michè/Ballata dell'eroe (1961) (KN 103)
Fabrizio: Il fannullone/Carlo Martello ritorna dalla battaglia di Poitiers (1963) (KN 177)
Fabrizio: Il testamento/La ballata del Michè (1963) (KN 184)
Fabrizio: La guerra di Piero/La ballata dell'eroe (1964) (KN 194)
Fabrizio: Valzer per un amore/La canzone di Marinella (1964) (KN 204)
Fabrizio: Per i tuoi larghi occhi/Fila la lana (1965) (KN 206)
Fabrizio: La città vecchia/Delitto di paese (1965) (KN 209)
Fabrizio: Canzone dell'amore perduto/Ballata dell'amore cieco o della vanità (1966) (KN 214)
Fabrizio: Geordie/Amore che vieni amore che vai (1966) (KN 215)

Italian record labels
Record labels established in 1960
Record labels disestablished in 1966